Eucosma ommatoptera is a species of moth of the family Tortricidae. It is found in Japan, China and the Russian Far East.

Subspecies
Eucosma ommatoptera ommatoptera (Russian Far East)
Eucosma ommatoptera kurilensis Kuznetzov, 1968 (Kuril Islands, Japan, China: Henan, Yunnan)

References

Moths described in 1965
Eucosmini